The Athletics at the 2016 Summer Paralympics – Men's 100 metres T54 event at the 2016 Paralympic Games took place on 16–17 September 2016, at the Estádio Olímpico João Havelange.

Heats 
The heats were held consecutively on the evening of 16 September.  21 athletes were divided into three heats of seven athletes each. Qualification to the final was automatic for the top two athletes in each heat, and the fastest two losers also qualified for the final.

Heat 1 
19:27 16 September 2016:

Heat 2 
19:34 16 September 2016:

Heat 3 
19:41 16 September 2016:

Final 
19:37 17 September 2016:

Notes

Athletics at the 2016 Summer Paralympics
2016 in men's athletics